Shamsur Rahman Kallue  (28 February 1932 - 19 December 1995) was the ninth Director General of the ISI and was in office from May 1989 – August 1990. He also served as a Lieutenant General in the Pakistan Army.

Early life and career
Shams ur Rehman Kallue was the only surviving son of Brigadier F. R. Kallue. He attended Doon's School, Dhera Doon from where he completed his senior Cambridge. Later he received his education from Gordon College, Rawalpindi. After that he joined 5th Pakistan Military Academy (PMA) long course and was commissioned in 1951 in 5 Probyn's Horse regiment.
Kallue served as the ninth DG ISI after Hamid Gul.

The American intelligence agency CIA wanted him to meet Masoud to put forward U.S. interests in the region.
Insight wrote (ibid):

Death

Shamsur Rahman Kallue died on December 19, 1995, in Rawalpindi and is buried at the army cemetery in Westridge, Rawalpindi.
He is one of a few officers who did not own any property. The plot that was given to him during his service was given to the needy soldiers. A loner and a lifelong bachelor, he rented half portion of a house, where he lived with his mother until his death.

References

External links

Directors General of Inter-Services Intelligence
Pakistani generals
Punjabi people
1994 deaths
1932 births
Government Gordon College alumni